Brahmin is a varna (class) in Hinduism specialising as scholars, priests, teachers (acharya) and protectors of sacred learning across generations.

Brahmin may also refer to:

 Brahmaeidae, also known as "Brahmin moths", a family of insects
 Brahmin, a two headed breed of cattle found in the Fallout video game series
 Boston Brahmin, a term often used to refer to the oldest families in Boston in Massachusetts, USA

See also
 Brahm (disambiguation)
 Brahma (disambiguation)
 Brahman (disambiguation)
 Brahmana